Thomas Pazyj (8 April 1955 – 27 November 2016) was a Danish handball player who competed in the 1976 Summer Olympics and in the 1980 Summer Olympics.

He was born in Copenhagen.

In 1976 he was part of the Danish team which finished eighth in the Olympic tournament. He played all six matches and scored 18 goals.

Four years later he finished ninth with the Danish team in the 1980 Olympic tournament. He played four matches and scored nine goals.

References

External links
 profile

1955 births
2016 deaths
Danish male handball players
Olympic handball players of Denmark
Handball players at the 1976 Summer Olympics
Handball players at the 1980 Summer Olympics
Handball players from Copenhagen